James W. DeMile (1938 – August 15, 2021) was an American martial artist and author. He was among the first group of students of Bruce Lee, whom he met in 1959, as they both attended Edison Technical School. In 1963, DeMile appeared in Lee's only book, The Philosophical Art of Self Defense. He was an inductee in the AMAA Who's Who in the Martial Arts Hall of Fame and Black Belt Magazine Hall of Fame.

Training with Bruce Lee
DeMile was of mixed race ancestry. He reportedly experienced a difficult childhood in an orphanage, with a history of teenage gang fights and petty crimes.
In 1959, a year after arriving in America, Bruce Lee decided to share his martial arts knowledge. What started as informal sparring sessions between friends turned into a three-school business that cemented Bruce's pioneering approach to the art of hand-in-hand fighting.

Lee attracted DeMile into his first group of students from a public display of his talents when he attended Edison Technical School in Seattle. Looking for a volunteer in the audience, the 18/19-year-old Lee discovered DeMile, 20/21, a former Air Force heavyweight boxing champ. Bruce noticed DeMile's athletic build and called him on stage. DeMile thought it would be easy to stop Lee because his opponent was only 5'7" tall and weighed no more than 140 pounds, but Lee soon beat him. Impressed, DeMile turned to Lee after the demo to ask if he could learn from him.

These public demonstrations attracted a small following. The group practiced outside Ruby Chow's restaurant where Lee waited tables. After a long shift taking orders and serving customers DeMile introduced Lee to one of the three men he would later certify as an instructor, 38-year-old Taky Kimura.

In the book Disciples of the Dragon, DeMile stated that they were all dummies for Lee's training. One of the reasons Lee modified his Wing Chun techniques and created Jeet Kune Do, was because the westerners were bigger and stronger than he was and once they would learn the basics of Wing Chun, they could become a real threat to him.

Martial arts achievements
James DeMile was the creator of Wing Chun Do.

Virgin Australia Airlines Airlines contracted DeMile to create a program to train its in-flight cabin and ground crew staff with the tactics to disarm and immobilize a threatening passenger or terrorist.

DeMile has trained United States Secret Service operatives, FBI agents, Federal marshals and police officers specializing in riots.

Bibliography 
 Tao of Wing Chun Do, Bruce Lee's Chi Sao
 Tao of Wing Chun Do: Mind and Body in Harmony
 Bruce Lee's 1 and 3 Inch Power Punch

Filmography 
{| class="wikitable sortable"
|+
|-
! Year
! Title
! Role
! class="unsortable" | Notes
|-
| 1967
| The Last Adventure
| N/A
|
|-
|1993
| Bruce Lee: The Curse of the Dragon
| Himself
|
|-|}

References

1935 births
2021 deaths
American Jeet Kune Do practitioners
People from San Francisco